Salvador Lues Soto (born 6 November 1999) is a Chilean rugby union player, who plays for Selknam.

Club career 
Born in Lima, Lues grew up in Santiago, where he played his rugby with the Craighouse Old Boys, before enjoying a spell in the Stade Toulousain academy from 2018 to 2020.

Back in Chile, he played with Selknam in the newly founded Súper Liga Americana de Rugby.

International career 
Salvador Lues was part of the Chilean team that qualified for their first Rugby World Cup in 2022, upsetting the odds against Canada and the United States, starting as a prop in the last game of the Americas qualification against the latter, an historic away win that sealed their qualification for the 2023 World Cup.

References

External links

1999 births
Sportspeople from Lima
Living people
Chilean rugby union players
Chile international rugby union players
Rugby union props
Selknam (rugby union) players